Cook County is a county located in the south central portion of the U.S. state of Georgia. As of the 2020 census, the population was 17,229. The county seat is Adel. The constitutional amendment to create the county was proposed July 30, 1918, and ratified November 5, 1918. It is named for former Civil War general Philip Cook of the Confederate States Army.

Reed Bingham State Park is in Cook County.

Geography

The western half of Cook County, located roughly west of Interstate 75, is located in the Little River sub-basin of the Suwannee River basin. The eastern half of the county is located in the Withlacoochee River sub-basin of the same Suwannee River basin.

Major highways
  Interstate 75
  U.S. Route 41
  State Route 7
  State Route 37
  State Route 76
  State Route 401 (unsigned designation for I-75)

Adjacent counties
 Tift County (north)
 Berrien County (east)
 Lowndes County (southeast)
 Brooks County (southwest)
 Colquitt County (west)

Demographics

2000 census
As of the census of 2000, there were 15,771 people, 5,882 households, and 4,282 families living in the county.  The population density was 69 people per square mile (27/km2).  There were 6,558 housing units at an average density of 29 per square mile (11/km2).  The racial makeup of the county was 67.93% White, 29.09% Black or African American, 0.22% Native American, 0.42% Asian, 0.03% Pacific Islander, 1.53% from other races, and 0.78% from two or more races.  3.08% of the population were Hispanic or Latino of any race.

There were 5,882 households, out of which 34.80% had children under the age of 18 living with them, 53.30% were married couples living together, 15.30% had a female householder with no husband present, and 27.20% were non-families. 24.00% of all households were made up of individuals, and 10.50% had someone living alone who was 65 years of age or older.  The average household size was 2.64 and the average family size was 3.12.

In the county, the population was spread out, with 28.20% under the age of 18, 9.10% from 18 to 24, 27.90% from 25 to 44, 21.80% from 45 to 64, and 13.00% who were 65 years of age or older.  The median age was 34 years. For every 100 females there were 92.10 males.  For every 100 females age 18 and over, there were 89.50 males.

The median income for a household in the county was $27,582, and the median income for a family was $31,820. Males had a median income of $26,262 versus $19,703 for females. The per capita income for the county was $13,465.  About 16.50% of families and 20.70% of the population were below the poverty line, including 27.90% of those under age 18 and 24.40% of those age 65 or over.

2010 census
As of the 2010 United States Census, there were 17,212 people, 6,339 households, and 4,594 families living in the county. The racial makeup of the county was 67.0% white, 27.3% black or African American, 0.7% Asian, 0.2% American Indian, 3.4% from other races, and 1.4% from two or more races. Those of Hispanic or Latino origin made up 5.9% of the population. In terms of ancestry, 21.5% were American, 9.9% were Irish, and 5.0% were German.

Of the 6,339 households, 38.1% had children under the age of 18 living with them, 49.8% were married couples living together, 16.5% had a female householder with no husband present, 27.5% were non-families, and 23.6% of all households were made up of individuals. The average household size was 2.69 and the average family size was 3.16. The median age was 36.4 years.

The median income for a household in the county was $31,390 and the median income for a family was $37,352. Males had a median income of $32,853 versus $25,122 for females. The per capita income for the county was $16,528. About 21.3% of families and 23.3% of the population were below the poverty line, including 29.9% of those under age 18 and 23.3% of those age 65 or over.

2020 census

As of the 2020 United States census, there were 17,229 people, 6,217 households, and 4,243 families residing in the county.

Education
It is within the Cook County School District. It operates Cook County High School.

Communities
 Adel (county seat)
 Cecil
 Lenox
 Sparks

Politics

See also

 National Register of Historic Places listings in Cook County, Georgia
List of counties in Georgia

References

External links
 Official Site
 Cook County historical marker

 
1918 establishments in Georgia (U.S. state)
Georgia (U.S. state) counties
Populated places established in 1918